Olympic Entertainment Group (OEG) is an Estonian concern which focuses on entertainment business. The Group is the leading provider of gaming services in Baltic States and also operates casinos in Italy, Malta and Slovakia.

The company's board members are Indrek Jürgenson since October 1, 2009 and Madis Jääger since December 27, 2010.

History 
In March 2018, the Luxembourg-based holding Novalpina, through its subsidiary Odyssey Europe AS, offered to buy all the shares of Olympic Entertainment Group. The takeover bid, which reached 288 million euros, was accepted by the board of OEG. The company was delisted from the Nasdaq Tallinn in October 2018, and a new CEO, Corey Plummer, was appointed the following month.

In April 2020, OEG signed an exclusive deal with GGNetwork.

Description 
As of December 2018, the Group had a total of 114 casinos and 23 betting points: 24 casinos in Estonia, 52 in Latvia, 17 in Lithuania, 6 in Slovakia, 14 in Italy and 1 in Malta.

As of 2019, by revenue of 30 million euros, the Group is 8th in Estonia.

The Group is employed 2852 people in 6 countries.

The Group has been in main list of Nasdaq Tallinn.

References

External links

Companies of Estonia